The Essex Generating Station is a peaking power plant  on the banks of the Passaic River, three miles east of Downtown in Newark, New Jersey.

Owned by the Public Service Electric and Gas Company, it was designed and constructed in 1915–16 and by 1924 six generators had been installed, totaling 214,444 kva.

Four simple cycle combustion turbines totaling 617 MW. Three were brought on line in 1971, and another in 1990. They were later replaced.

The electrical substation facility suffered severe damage during Hurricane Sandy. It is part of the PJM Interconnection of the Eastern Interconnection grid electric transmission system.

See also
List of power stations in New Jersey
Essex County Resource Recovery Facility
Newark Energy Center

References 

Natural gas-fired power stations in New Jersey
Power stations in Newark, New Jersey
Essex County, New Jersey
Energy infrastructure completed in 1924
Passaic River
Public Service Enterprise Group